The 2005 Purdue Boilermakers football team represented Purdue University during the 2005 NCAA Division I-A football season.  The team was coached by Joe Tiller and played its home games at Ross–Ade Stadium.  Purdue played eleven games in the 2005 season, finishing with a 5–6 record and missing a post-season bowl game for the first time since 1996.  Purdue was predicted by many as a dark horse for the Big Ten title, but after a strong 2–0 start, lost six straight before rebounding to finish a more respectable 5–6.

Schedule

Personnel

Game summaries

Akron

Arizona

Minnesota

Notre Dame

Iowa

Northwestern

Wisconsin

at Penn State

Michigan State

Illinois

Indiana

2006 NFL Draft

References

Purdue
Purdue Boilermakers football seasons
Purdue Boilermakers football